Michael Moffat (born 15 February 1985) is a Scottish footballer who plays as a striker for Glenafton Athletic, on loan from Ayr United.

Career

Girvan and Ayr United
Moffat spent six seasons in Junior football with Girvan before signing for Ayr United in January 2011. Moffat scored eleven goals in his first season at Ayr, including the winner against Brechin City to get the club promoted to the First Division. The following season, Moffat netted seven goals for the Honest Men, all of which came in the First Division. During the 2011–12 campaign, Moffat also appeared for Ayr at Hampden Park for the League Cup semi-final against local rivals, Kilmarnock. In June 2012, Moffat signed a new deal along with Mark Roberts to stay at the Somerset Park outfit, following the club's relegation to the Second Division.

Dunfermline Athletic
After an impressive 2013–14 season, in which he finished as league top scorer, Moffat signed for League One rivals Dunfermline Athletic. His first competitive goal for the side came in his debut against Annan Athletic in the Scottish League Cup. However, in his first season with Dunfermline, Moffat was unable to replicate the consistent goal scoring he had seen at both Girvan and then Ayr, managing only six competitive goals for the Pars in the 2014–15 season. His second season with the club started positively, with the striker surpassing his previous season's tally in his first twelve competitive matches. Of these goals, three were scored in consecutive league matches against Brechin City, Cowdenbeath and Peterhead, whilst he also scored a brace against league rivals Forfar Athletic in the Scottish Challenge Cup.

Ayr United return
After three seasons away, Moffat returned to Ayr United on 23 May 2017, signing a two-year deal with the club.

Career statistics

Honours

Club
Dunfermline Athletic
Scottish League One: 2015–16
Ayr United
Scottish League One: 2017–18

References

External links
 

Living people
Scottish footballers
Girvan F.C. players
Ayr United F.C. players
Scottish Football League players
Scottish Junior Football Association players
Association football forwards
1985 births
Scottish Professional Football League players
West of Scotland Football League players
Glenafton Athletic F.C. players